Diathrausta harlequinalis, the harlequin webworm moth, is a moth in the family Crambidae. It was described by Harrison Gray Dyar Jr. in 1913. It is found in North America in Mexico, Arizona, California, Colorado, Connecticut, Florida, Maryland, Massachusetts, Minnesota, New Mexico, North Carolina, Oklahoma, Ontario, Quebec, South Carolina, Tennessee and Texas.

The wingspan is 13 mm. Adults have been recorded from March to October.

Subspecies
Diathrausta harlequinalis harlequinalis
Diathrausta harlequinalis amaura Munroe, 1956
Diathrausta harlequinalis lauta Munroe, 1956
Diathrausta harlequinalis montana Haimbach, 1915

References

Moths described in 1913
Spilomelinae